John Hamilton Mackie (8 January 1898 – 29 December 1958) was a Scottish Unionist Party Member of Parliament (MP) for Galloway from 1931 to 1958.

He was a member of the antisemitic and pro-Nazi Right Club established by Archibald Maule Ramsay in 1938.

Having been refused a Conservative nomination at the 1945 general election, Mackie was re-elected and sat as an "Independent Unionist" from 1945 to 1948. The Conservative whip was restored in 1948 and he continued to represent Galloway until his death.

References

External links
 Profile, spartacus-educational.com

1898 births
1958 deaths
Members of the Parliament of the United Kingdom for Scottish constituencies
Independent members of the House of Commons of the United Kingdom
Independent politicians in Scotland
Unionist Party (Scotland) MPs
UK MPs 1931–1935
UK MPs 1935–1945
UK MPs 1945–1950
UK MPs 1950–1951
UK MPs 1951–1955
UK MPs 1955–1959
Place of birth missing